Albert Lee Stephens Sr. (January 25, 1874 – January 15, 1965) was a United States circuit judge of the United States Court of Appeals for the Ninth Circuit from 1937 to 1965.  Prior to that, he was a United States district judge of the United States District Court for the Southern District of California and the Presiding Justice of the California Court of Appeal, Second District, Division Two.

Education and career

Born in State Line City, Indiana, Stephens read law in 1899 and received a Bachelor of Laws from the USC Gould School of Law in 1903. He was in private practice of law in Los Angeles, California from 1899 to 1906. He was a Justice of the Peace in Los Angeles from 1906 to 1910. He was in private practice from 1910 to 1911. He was a civil service commissioner for State of California from 1911 to 1913. He was city attorney of Los Angeles from 1913 to 1919. He was in private practice from 1919 to 1920. He was a Judge of the Superior Court of Los Angeles County from 1919 to 1932. He was appointed by Governor James Rolph as an associate justice of the District Court of Appeal, succeeding Ira F. Thompson and serving from 1932 to 1933 and then serving as Presiding Justice of that court from 1933 to 1935.

Federal judicial service

Stephens was nominated by President Franklin D. Roosevelt on August 21, 1935, to the United States District Court for the Southern District of California, to a new seat created by 49 Stat. 508. He was confirmed by the United States Senate on August 23, 1935, and received his commission on August 24, 1935. His service was terminated on June 21, 1937, due to his elevation to the Ninth Circuit.

Stephens was nominated by President Roosevelt on June 8, 1937, to the United States Court of Appeals for the Ninth Circuit, to a new seat created by 50 Stat. 64. He was confirmed by the Senate on June 15, 1937, and received his commission on June 18, 1937. He served as Chief Judge from 1957 to 1959 and as a member of the Judicial Conference of the United States from 1957 to 1958. He assumed senior status on January 25, 1961. His service was terminated on January 15, 1965, due to his death.

Family

Stephens's son, Albert Lee Stephens Jr., was also a federal judge in California.

See also
 Robert S. MacAlister, subject of a Stephens decision allowing him to serve as a Los Angeles City Council member, 1934–39

References

1874 births
1965 deaths
USC Gould School of Law alumni
Judges of the United States District Court for the Southern District of California
United States district court judges appointed by Franklin D. Roosevelt
Judges of the United States Court of Appeals for the Ninth Circuit
United States court of appeals judges appointed by Franklin D. Roosevelt
20th-century American judges
People from Warren County, Indiana
Judges of the California Courts of Appeal